The 1991 Kentucky Derby was the 117th running of the Kentucky Derby. The race took place on May 4, 1991, with 135,554 people in attendance.

The Road to the 1991 Kentucky Derby

Heading into the Derby, it was seen as a wide-open race with multiple horses having a chance at victory.

Fly So Free had an impressive resume coming into the race. He won the Grade-3  Tremont Breeders' Cup Stakes, the Grade-1 Champagne Stakes, the Grade-1 Breeders' Cup Juvenile, the Grade-2 Hutcheson Stakes, the Grade-2 Fountain of Youth Stakes and the Grade-1 Florida Derby. Through these wins, he had already defeated most of the field in various races.

Best Pal also had an impressive resume with multiple wins at the Grade-3 1990  Balboa Stakes, the Grade-2 Del Mar Futurity, the Grade-1 Norfolk Stakes and the Grade-1  Hollywood Futurity. He also finished ahead of Sea Cadet at the 1991 Santa Anita Derby. 

 Hansel had won the Grade-3 July 1990  Tremont Breeders' Cup Stakes, the Grade-2 September 1990 Arlington-Washington Futurity Stakes, the March 1991 Grade-2  Jim Beam Stakes(where he defeated Wilder Than Ever) and the April 1991 Grade-2 Lexington Stakes.  However, he was defeated soundly twice by Fly So Free.

Strike the Gold had won the April 1991 Blue Grass Stakes defeating favorite Fly So Free by a half-length after finishing 2nd to Fly So Free at the 1991 Florida Derby.

Green Alligator captured the April 1991 Grade-3 California Derby in his only stakes win.

Quintana was victorious at the March 1991 Grade-3 Rebel Stakes winning over fellow 1991 Kentucky Derby competitor, Corporate Report.

Alydavid won the Grade-3 April 1991  Derby Trial Stakes and was a half-brother of Strike the Gold.

Sea Cadet won the January 1991 El Camino Real Derby and the March 1991 San Felipe Stakes, placing multiple positions ahead of Green Alligator. 

Mane Minister picked up smaller victories in the January 1991 listed Santa Catalina Stakes and the 1991 listed Pirate Cove Stakes.

Paulrus, Another Review, Corporate Report, Happy Jazz Band, Forty Something, Lost Mountain, Subordinated Debt and Wilder Than Ever had never won a stakes race and were seen as wildcards.

Dinard won the Grade-2 1991 San Rafael Stakes. He defeated Best Pal in what was called "the single most compelling performance of the year" in the Grade-1 1991 Santa Anita Derby. He was considered an early favorite for the Kentucky Derby, but suffered a foreleg injury and was declared out.

Olympio, winner of the 1991 Arkansas Derby, who had traded wins with Dinard, was also seen as a possible candidate for the Kentucky Derby. However, his owners decided to skip the race for the 1991 Preakness Stakes, where he finished 7th.

Cahill Road was also seen as a contender after winning the April 1991 Wood Memorial Stakes, but injured his left front leg in the victory and was retired.

Full results

 Winning Breeder: Calumet Farm; (KY)

Payout

 $2 Exacta: (4-10) Paid $73.40

See also 

 1991 Preakness Stakes
 1991 Belmont Stakes

References

1991
Kentucky Derby
Derby
Kentucky
Kentucky Derby